Marron Junction railway station was a later addition to the Cockermouth and Workington Railway. It opened on 2 April 1866 with a single, eastbound, platform when the adjacent Marron Junction opened, two months before the company was absorbed by the London and North Western Railway.

In 1874 an island platform was added to the south of the main east–west line, opposite the single eastbound platform. giving three platform faces.

History
Marron Junction joined the west-east Workington to Cockermouth (later through to Penrith) line with the then new south–north Whitehaven, Cleator and Egremont Railway line from Rowrah. The junction was in open country. It had a substantial triangular layout with an engine shed inside the south-to-east arm. Both the west-to-east and south-to-west arms bridged the River Marron. Marron Junction station was immediately west of the junction's northwestern apex. The triangular layout warranted three signalboxes, one at each apex.

The station was bounded by the River Derwent to the north and was not near any town or village. It was intended as an exchange station for passengers crossing between the east–west and south–north lines. South-north trains terminated at Marron Junction station, from which passengers could travel west or east. The value of this arrangement hinged on the connections.

The station attracted little custom other than railwaymen whose duties took them to Marron Junction.

The station closed to regular passenger traffic in 1897. From then on the south–north trains from Rowrah continued through to Workington Main, an altogether more satisfactory service for its users. Passengers wishing to travel south to east stayed on to the next stop west of the junction - Camerton - and crossed to the other platform to head east.

Although Marron Junction station closed in 1897 railwaymen continued to use it as an unadvertised halt until after 1923.

The south-to-east curve at Marron junction was closed on 1 October 1902. This rendered the south and east signalboxes redundant. The western 'box was replaced to befit its singular role. Normal passenger traffic ended along the south to west curve on 13 April 1931, with normal goods traffic following in 1954. An enthusiasts' special ran south-to-west on 5 September 1954. After scant occasional use the south-to-west line was abandoned in 1960.

Afterlife
By 2015 Marron Junction triangle was readily discernible on satellite images online. The station site appeared to be a footpath through ribbons of trees.

See also

 Cockermouth, Keswick and Penrith Railway

References

Sources

Further reading

External links
Map of the line with photos in RAILSCOT
The station on overlain OS maps surveyed from 1898 in National Library of Scotland
The station in Rail Map Online
The railways of Cumbria in Cumbrian Railways Association
Photos of Cumbrian railways in Cumbrian Railways Association
The railways of Cumbria in Railways_of_Cumbria
Cumbrian Industrial History in Cumbria Industrial History Society
Local history of the CKPR route in Cockermouth
The line's and station's Engineer's Line References in Railway Codes
A video tour-de-force of the region's closed lines in Cumbria Film Archive
Furness Railtour using many West Cumberland lines 5 September 1954 in Six Bells Junction
McGowan Gradon's 1942 Furness Railway study in Cumberland Archives

Disused railway stations in Cumbria
Former London and North Western Railway stations
Railway stations in Great Britain opened in 1866
Railway stations in Great Britain closed in 1897